Sir Anthony James Allan Havelock-Allan, 4th Baronet (28 February 1904 – 11 January 2003) was a British film producer and screenwriter whose credits included This Happy Breed, Blithe Spirit, Great Expectations, Oliver Twist, the 1968 version of Romeo and Juliet and Ryan's Daughter.

Personal life and career
Havelock-Allan was born at the family home of Blackwell Grange near Darlington, County Durham, and was educated at Charterhouse and schools in Switzerland. Before becoming a film producer, he worked as a stockbroker, jeweller, record company executive and cabaret manager.

In 1935, Havelock-Allan joined the short-lived British and Dominions Imperial Studios, producing films with them like Lancashire Luck (1937) until and even shortly after the studios burnt down in 1936. After working with her on This Man in Paris, Havelock-Allan married actress Valerie Hobson on 12 April 1939. Their sons were Simon Anthony Clerveaux Havelock-Allan (1944–2001) and Sir Mark Havelock-Allan (born 4 April 1951). They divorced in 1952.

Collaboration with David Lean and Ronald Neame
Havelock-Allan served as associated producer on the 1942 war film In Which We Serve, which starred Noël Coward, who co-directed the picture with David Lean. The film was shot by cinematographer Ronald Neame, who along with Havelock-Allan and Lean, founded their own company, Cineguild. Cineguild's first production was a film adaptation of Coward's 1939 play This Happy Breed, which was produced by Coward, directed by Lean, and shot by Neame. All three partners — Havelock-Allan, Lean and Neame — collaborated on the script.

The exact same combination of talents created the 1945 film adaptation of Coward's comedy Blithe Spirit. The quartet then produced the classic Brief Encounter, with Havelock-Allan and Neame sharing producing duties with Coward, with Coward helping write the script, an adaption of his 1936 one-act play Still Life. The film won the Palme d'Or at the 1946 Cannes Film Festival while lead Celia Johnson was nominated for an Academy Award for Best Actress in the 1947 awards. In 1999, Brief Encounter came in second in a British Film Institute poll of the top 100 British films.

Havelock-Allan, Lean and Neame moved away from Coward and next filmed two classic by Charles Dickens, creating two classics of British cinema in the process. Both Great Expectations (1946) and Oliver Twist (1948) brought the three Oscar nominations for the Academy Award for Best Adapted Screenplay.

After Cineguild
He left Cineguild and founded Constellation Films in 1947. He later co-founded British Home Entertainment with Lord Brabourne in 1960. He later was reunited with David Lean when he produced the great director's penultimate film, Ryan's Daughter (1970).

Havelock-Allan married second wife María Teresa Consuelo Sara Ruiz de Villafranca known just as Sara Ruiz de Villafranca, a daughter of the former Spanish Ambassador to Chile and Brazil, on 26 June 1979.

In 1975, he had succeeded to his childless brother's baronetcy and on his own death in 2003, aged 98, his title passed to his surviving son, Mark.

Honours

Academy Awards

Hugo Awards

Filmography
All as producer, unless otherwise stated:

1970 Ryan's Daughter
1968 Romeo and Juliet
1968 Up the Junction
1967 The Mikado
1965 Othello
1962 The Quare Fellow
1958 Orders to Kill
1954 The Young Lovers
1953 Never Take No for an Answer
1952 Meet Me Tonight
1951 The Small Miracle
1950 Shadow of the Eagle
1949 The Interrupted Journey
1949 The Small Voice
1948 Blanche Fury
1947 Take My Life
1946 Great Expectations – (Executive producer)
1945 Brief Encounter – (uncredited)
1942 In Which We Serve – (Associate producer)
1942 Unpublished Story
1941 From the Four Corners (director)
1940 This Man in Paris
1939 The Lambeth Walk
1939 The Silent Battle
1938 This Man Is News
1938 A Spot of Bother
1938 Incident in Shanghai
1938 Lightning Conductor
1937 Missing, Believed Married
1937 Mr. Smith Carries On
1937 Night Ride
1937 The Fatal Hour
1937 Museum Mystery
1937 The Cavalier of the Streets
1937 Cross My Heart
1937 Holiday's End
1937 Lancashire Luck
1937 The Last Curtain
1936 The Scarab Murder Case
1936 Show Flat
1936 Grand Finale 
1936 Murder by Rope
1936 Pay Box Adventure
1936 Two on a Doorstep
1936 Wednesday's Luck
1936 Love at Sea
1936 The Secret Voice
1936 House Broken
1936 The Belles of St. Clements
1936 Ticket of Leave
1935 Expert's Opinion
1935 Checkmate
1935 Lucky Days
1935 Cross Currents
1935 The Mad Hatters
1935 Jubilee Window
1935 Once a Thief
1935 School for Stars
1935 The Village Squire
1935 Key to Harmony
1935 The Price of Wisdom
1935 Gentlemen's Agreement

References

External links
 

1904 births
2003 deaths
Baronets in the Baronetage of the United Kingdom
English film producers
English stockbrokers
People from the Borough of Darlington
People educated at Gibbs School
People educated at Charterhouse School
20th-century English businesspeople